The 2017 Formula D season is the fourteenth season of the Formula D Pro Championship series and fourth season of the Pro2 series. The Pro Championship series began on March 31 at Long Beach and ended on October 14 at Irwindale Speedway  with Irish driver James Deane winning his first Pro Championship.

Teams and drivers

Pro championship

Schedule and results

Calendar changes & notes
On August 9, 2017, the owners of Irwindale Speedway announced that the venue will cease operations in January 2018. Formula D has held a round at the Irwindale Speedway every year since their inaugural season.

Standings

Pro championship

Standings
Event winners in bold.

Notes:
Bold — Round winner
X — Did not attend event

Manufacturer Cup

Tire Cup

References

External links
 

Formula D seasons
Formula D